Tsumura (written: 津村) is a Japanese surname. Notable people with the surname include:

David Toshio Tsumura (born 1944), Japanese linguist, Old Testament scholar and writer
, Japanese politician
, Japanese Magic: The Gathering player
, Japanese writer
, Japanese voice actress
Scott Tsumura (born 1942), American video game producer

Japanese-language surnames